The Columbus School of Law, also known as Catholic Law or CUA Law, is the law school of the Catholic University of America, a private Roman Catholic research university in Washington, D.C.

More than 400 Juris Doctor students attend Catholic Law. Incoming classes are typically composed of about 150 students, including day and evening programs. Around 1,500 students apply annually. According to Catholic Law's 2021 ABA-required disclosures, 59% of 2021 graduates obtained full-time, long-term employment requiring bar passage nine months after graduation.

History 
Catholic University of America began offering instruction in law in 1895 as part of its decision to open "faculties for the laity." The department was turned into an official school in 1898.

In 1919, the Knights of Columbus founded an educational program known as Columbus University which provided an evening education program for Catholic war veterans returning from World War I.  This institution was closely affiliated with Catholic University and shared faculty at both institutions' Washington, D.C. locations. In 1954, Columbus University (then consisting only of an evening law school) merged with Catholic University's law school to form the Columbus School of Law.

The law school has been accredited by the Association of American Law Schools since 1921 and the American Bar Association since 1925. Catholic University's law school has established a progressive history of inclusion. Its first African-American student was enrolled in 1902; its first female student in 1922.

Rankings
In the 2023 "Best Law Schools" edition of U.S. News & World Report, the Columbus School of Law is ranked 94th. Its part-time program is ranked 38th.

Student body
, Catholic Law enrolled 406 J.D. students, including 161 first-year students. Catholic Law received 1493 applications for 2021 enrollment and offered admission to 593, an acceptance rate of 40%. Among its first-year class, the median LSAT score was 158 and median undergraduate GPA was 3.5.

Of Catholic Law's  enrolled in October 2021, 283 (70%) attended full-time and 123 (30%) attended part-time. According to the U.S. News & World Report, 60% of the student body was female and 40% male. In addition, the student body was 68% white, 10% Hispanic, 6% Black or African American, 5% Asian, less than 1% Pacific Islander and American Indian, 5% two or more races, 5% unknown race, and 1% international.

In the 2013–2014 academic year, Catholic Law admitted 161 students and enrolled a total of 519 students. The law school had the third largest drop in enrollment between the 2010–2011 academic year and 2013–2014 academic year, with enrollment falling 39.5%.

Over 30 student organizations are active on campus. The school has a moot court program with teams practicing in international law, communications law, labor law, constitutional law, securities law, national security, and a trials competition. The moot court team holds an annual inter-school competition between 1Ls called SoapBox.

Costs
, annual tuition and fees were $56,040 for full-time J.D. students and $38,690 for part-time J.D. students. The annual estimated total cost of attendance for J.D. students not living with their parents, which includes tuition and fees, living expenses, transportation expenses, book expenses, and miscellaneous personal expenses, was $85,840 for full-time students and $68,490 for part-time students. Between 2015 and 2019, the average annual increase in tuition and fees at Catholic Law was 2.86%. In addition, in the 2020–21 academic year, 98% of part-time students and 100% of full-time students received a scholarship or grant from Catholic Law.

Employment outcomes
According to Catholic Law's official 2021 ABA-required disclosures, the first-time bar passage rate of 2020 graduates was 89%. Within nine months of graduation, 59% of 2021 graduates obtained full-time, long-term employment requiring bar passage; 23% obtained employment in full-time, long-term positions where having a J.D. was preferred; 2% obtained employment in other full-time, long-term professional positions; and the remaining 16% either obtained short-term positions or part-time positions, did not obtain employment, or did not report their employment status. None of those jobs were school-funded positions. Graduates who obtained full-time, long-term positions within nine months of graduation became employed in a variety of contexts, including approximately 4% in federal judicial clerkships, 15% in state and local judicial clerkships, 24% in government, 29% in private practice, 21% in business and industry, 6% in public interest, and 1% in education. Geographically, most of Catholic Law's 2021 graduates who became employed within nine months of graduation were hired to work in Washington, D.C., followed by Virginia and Maryland.

Catholic Law ranked 150th out of the 201 ABA-approved law schools in terms of the percentage of 2013 graduates with non-school-funded, full-time, long-term, bar-passage-required jobs nine months after graduation.

Academics

Curriculum 

Catholic University's J.D. program can be completed over three years of full-time day study or four years of part-time evening study. The first-year curriculum is prescribed for all students. The day-division curriculum consists of seven required courses totaling 29 credit hours. Evening-division students are required to complete the same basic courses within the first two years of their law school career. Revised for 2013, the curriculum is designed to strengthen first-year doctrinal courses, to support the development of practice-area concentrations, and to emphasize training that will help graduates transition to the real world of practice.

The upper-division curriculum comprises several requirements, courses that are strongly recommended, and elective options. Catholic Law students must complete a minimum of 84 credits to earn the J.D. degree. Required upper division courses include Constitutional Law II, Professional Responsibility, Professional Skills, and Upper-Level Writing. The law school is developing a Transition-to-Practice requirement for students. This requirement is expected to be fulfilled by taking either a clinical course or a capstone course. Foundational courses for all areas of legal practice—and thus strongly recommended for all upper-class students—include Evidence, Corporations, and Criminal Procedure.

To respond to increasing demand for specialized legal services, the Law School has developed practice-area concentrations for upper division students in Civil Litigation, Criminal Litigation, Family Law, Intellectual Property, Labor and Employment Law, and Securities Regulation.

Degrees offered
In addition to the J.D. program, the school offers LL.M. programs in Law & Technology, Securities Law, and Comparative and International Law.

The school also offers an LL.M. program in American law with the Faculty of Law and Administration of the Jagiellonian University in Kraków, Poland. It allows Jagiellonian law students and students enrolled in the CUA-JU LL.M. program to study the essential substantive and procedural elements of the legal system of the United States.

The school offers a M.L.S. degree program, which enhances the ability of professionals to work with lawyers and legal issues, to gain a deeper knowledge of a particular legal field, and to understand laws and regulations. Students can choose to concentrate in the fields of Compliance and Corporate Responsibility, Employment and Human Resources, or Intellectual Property.  Alternatively, students may choose a General U.S. Law option, which provides a broad overview of the law and legal practice.

Faculty
, Catholic Law had 86 faculty members, including 29 full-time faculty members and 57 non-full-time faculty members. The law school's student-faculty ratio was 7.1 to 1.

Institutes and programs
Catholic Law offers five opportunities for specialized legal study; four of them are certificate-granting.  The programs are designed to give students the opportunity to pursue a specified concentration of courses. Each institute accepts approximately 15 students each academic year. They are:
Law and Technology Institute
Comparative and International Law Institute
Law and Public Policy Program
Securities and Corporate Law Program
Interdisciplinary Program in Law and Religion

Experiential learning 
Founded in 1969, Columbus Community Legal Services offers four legal clinics that offer students hands-on learning. The Columbus Community Legal Services clinics include the General Practice Clinic; the Families and the Law Clinic; Advocacy for the Elderly, and the Consumer Protection Clinic. In addition, the school offers the Criminal Prosecution Clinic, the Immigration Litigation Clinic, the Innocence Project Clinic and Clemency Project, the Virginia Criminal Defense Clinic, and an SEC Student Observer Program.

The Columbus School of Law has an extensive legal externship program through which about 200 upper-class students per year earn course credits during the fall, spring, and summer semesters by working in nonprofit organizations; federal, state, and local government agencies; Congress; and for judges, law firms, trade associations, and corporations in the D.C. area.

Publications
The Columbus School of Law has two student-edited law journals:
Catholic University Law Review
Catholic University Journal of Law and Technology

Campus 
The Columbus School of Law is located on the campus of the Catholic University of America, and law students have access to many of the same services and facilities as undergraduate students. Completed in 1994, the law school building contains the Kathryn J. DuFour Law Library, the Walter A. Slowinski and Haislip and Yewell Courtrooms, and the three-story Keelty Atrium. The building is located in the Brookland neighborhood of Washington, D.C. and is a five-minute walk from the Brookland-CUA metro station.

Notable alumni

Congress
Bob Casey Jr., U.S. Senator for Pennsylvania, 1988 
Tom Harkin, U.S. Senator for Iowa, 1972

Federal government
Kathleen Q. Abernathy, former Federal Communications Commission Commissioner 
Naomi C. Earp, U.S. Equal Employment Opportunity Commission member
John H. Fanning, former National Labor Relations Board Chair
Daniel M. Gallagher, Commissioner of the U.S. Securities and Exchange Commission
Brendan Carr, Commissioner of the Federal Communications Commission
David Redl, Assistant Secretary for Communications and Information at the United States Department of Commerce

Federal judiciary
Edward J. Damich, Chief Judge of the United States Court of Federal Claims
Colleen Kollar-Kotelly, U.S. District Court for the District of Columbia and the presiding judge of the Foreign Intelligence Surveillance Court
Joseph F. Leeson, Jr., Judge of the United States District Court for the Eastern District of Pennsylvania
Christine Luchok Fallon, Reporter of Decisions for the U.S. Supreme Court

State government
Martin Connor, New York State Senator
Kathy Hochul, Governor of New York, 1983
Susan Longley, State Senator from Maine
Peggy A. Quince, Justice of the Florida Supreme Court
Robert A. Watson, Rhode Island House Minority Leader
Stephen McNichols, governor of Colorado
William J. Shea, Connecticut Supreme Court justice

Business
Michael Bidwill, Arizona Cardinals President

Non-profit
Alexandra Dunn, executive director and general counsel of the Environmental Council of States

References

External links 

 
Catholic law schools in the United States
Law schools in Washington, D.C.
Private universities and colleges in Washington, D.C.
Educational institutions established in 1898
1898 establishments in Washington, D.C.
Knights of Columbus
Colleges and schools of the Catholic University of America